The ebm-papst Group is a manufacturer of electric motors and fans. It came into existence in 2003 when the companies Elektrobau Mulfingen GmbH & Co. KG (ebm), Papst Motoren GmbH in St. Georgen and Motoren Ventilatoren Landshut GmbH (mvl) merged. The company employs around 13,000 employees at 25 production facilities (including those in Germany, China, and the USA) and 49 sales offices worldwide. The headquarters is located in Mulfingen in the Hohenlohe district of Germany.

History
In 1963 Gerhard Sturm founded Elektrobau Mulfingen GmbH & Co. KG. along with Günther Ziehl and Heinz Ziehl. The company then had 35 employees and concentrated on developing and producing small external rotor motors. In 1965, the first compact fans with EC technology were developed, which at this time was still known as non-commutator DC motors. Papst Motoren GmbH, founded by Herman Papst in St. Georgen in the Black Forest in 1942, was acquired in 1992, the plant in Landshut was purchased from Alcatel in 1997 and was simultaneously renamed Motoren Ventilatoren Landshut GmbH (mvl). In the following year the first energy-saving centrifugal and axial fans with integrated electronics were developed; among other products, the ebm-papst EC fans brought to market maturity in the following years were based on these. In 2003 the three companies were renamed ebm-papst Mulfingen, ebm-papst St. Georgen and ebm-papst Landshut. In 2007, construction of the energy-independent factory for energy-saving fans began in Mulfingen-Hollenbach, which was put into operation in 2008.

For the first time, ebm-papst surpassed the turnover threshold of a billion EUR in 2007. Gerhard Sturm became the Chairman of the Advisory Board. Since 2008, only managers from outside the family have been employed as managing directors.

Products

Motors and fans of the ebm-papst group are used in a variety of application areas, some of which are in Dresden's Semper Opera, on the roofs of Australian supermarkets, in computers and refrigerators. With nearly 20,000 products, the company has the largest product range in the world by its own account and supplies customers from the most diverse industries. ebm-papst products are used in applications such as ventilation, air-conditioning and refrigeration technology, household appliances, heating engineering, in IT/telecommunications applications as well as those in automotive and commercial vehicle engineering.

The fans are mostly based on external rotor motors, since these enable implementation of particularly compact axial, centrifugal and diagonal fans. Motors for drive technology are, in part, also designed as internal rotor motors.

In recent years, quiet, electronically commutated motors with increased energy efficiency have been finding use. These are available in versions for 1 or 3-phase alternating current and for direct current between 12 and 48 volts. By means of the already integrated electronics, EC motors have very good control characteristics, including integrated pressure, temperature or air flow control. The integrated electronics also reduce the wiring effort as opposed to a comparable conventional solution. The option of a bus connection makes it possible to network these units and control them centrally. Many new and innovative options can be adjusted in a user-friendly way via the bus system (ebmBUS or MODBUS). This is why various computer programs are offered, ranging to wireless configuration of a fan or motor by mobile phone.

Classic AC motors for 1 or 3-phase alternating current are still available as alternatives. The fans produced have axial or centrifugal impellers with a diameter between approximately 30 mm and 1250 mm and are likewise developed in-house. Cross-flow blowers, as they are used in façade ventilation, are also in the product range. The impellers are made of either plastic, metal or more recently also a metal-plastic material combination. This innovative combination enables high strength as with metal impellers while retaining their conventional variable moldability.

In 2009, the "green" fan series, HyBlade, came to market. The product group, consisting of plastic blades with inserted aluminium reinforcement, enables low power consumption and is quiet. The newest product to be introduced in Spring of 2011 is a motor with housing sections made of a wood-plastic composite material.

GreenTech

ebm-papst summarises its environmental protection efforts and energy-saving measures with the term "GreenTech". Measures include a CO₂-oriented conversion of the fleet, heat insulation on buildings, energy savings with compressor stations and production equipment. Selection of awards in the area of GreenTech:

 Nomination for the Hermes Award 2010 (Hannover Messe) for invention of a fan that reduces energy consumption and noise by 50% (the savings potential of 1 large-scale power plant in Europe)
 Environmental technology award 2009 (Baden-Wuerttemberg) for a hybrid axial fan (topic: energy-efficient use of materials)
 Dena Energy Efficiency Award 2009 for a new plant in Germany (20 million EUR investment). The plant requires no energy for heating, ventilation and air-conditioning
 Environmental prize 2008 (Baden-Wuerttemberg) for environmentally oriented actions of an industrial company: including operating its own bus lines for Mulfingen (for 1,200 employees → less traffic volume and less parking space necessary)
 Strategy for new developments "Each new product has to be better than its predecessor"; CO₂ reduction in production (including a new plant; green roof) and processes (including an enamelling line; heating and compressor systems).

References

External links
 

Electrical equipment manufacturers
Manufacturing companies of Germany
Manufacturing companies established in 1963
1963 establishments in West Germany